Lydia Veicht (1922 – 18 September 2007) was a German figure skater. She won five national titles. She placed fifth at the 1938 World Championships and fourth at the 1939 World Championships.  

Veicht worked also as an actress, appearing in the movies The Black Forest Girl (1950) and The Colourful Dream (1952).

Results

References
 Eissportmagazin 2007 {http://eissport-magazin.de/}

1922 births
2007 deaths
German female single skaters